Aladár Virág (born 19 February 1983 in Debrecen) is a Hungarian football player who played for Balmazújvárosi FC.

External links 
HLSZ
Atromitos Yeroskipou

1983 births
Living people
Sportspeople from Debrecen
Hungarian footballers
Association football midfielders
Diósgyőri VTK players
Debreceni VSC players
Nyíregyháza Spartacus FC players
Győri ETO FC players
Rákospalotai EAC footballers
Atromitos Yeroskipou players
Anagennisi Deryneia FC players
Balmazújvárosi FC players
Nemzeti Bajnokság I players
Cypriot First Division players
Cypriot Second Division players
Hungarian expatriate footballers
Expatriate footballers in Cyprus
Hungarian expatriate sportspeople in Cyprus